NMI or nmi may refer to:

Organisations
 National Museum of Ireland
 Nelson Mandela Institution
 NMI Mobility, (Northwestel Mobility Inc) a spin-off of the Canadian company Northwestel
 New Mexico Airlines (ICAO code)
 Nissan Motor Indonesia
 National Museum of Indonesia
 Nazarene Missions International, a ministry of the Church of the Nazarene

Metrology
 National metrology institute, in metrology
 National Measurement Institute, the measurement standards body of the Australian government
 Norwegian Meteorological Institute

Science and technology
 Nautical mile (nmi)
 New Machine Interface, an instruction format used in the IBM i operating system
 Non-maskable interrupt, in computing
 NMI (gene)

Other uses
 No middle initial
 Nonprofit Marketplace Initiative, an initiative that sought to make individual philanthropic donations more evidence-based
 Northern Mariana Islands, a U.S. insular area
 Nyam language (ISO 639 code)

See also
 NRO Management Information System (NMIS), a computer network